Timothy Robbins Stanley (Hartford, Connecticut, May 14, 1810 – July 8, 1874) was a colonel of the 18th Ohio Infantry during the American Civil War. He was brevetted brigadier general, US Volunteers, on March 13, 1865, for "gallant and meritorious services during the war".  He commanded a brigade at the Battle of Stones River.

Notes

Sources

External links

18th Ohio Volunteer Infantry website

1810 births
1874 deaths
Union Army colonels
People of Ohio in the American Civil War